Miller-Motte College, formerly Miller-Motte Technical College, is a system of private for-profit technical colleges throughout the southeastern United States. Its parent company is Ancora Education.

History

Miller-Motte was founded in 1916, in Wilmington, North Carolina, as a small training facility for courtroom stenographers. Over the years, the college established other campuses in Tennessee, North Carolina, South Carolina, Virginia, and Georgia. In 1998, the school was acquired by Delta Career Education Corporation It was sold to Ancora Education in 2018.

Accreditation
Miller-Motte is accredited by the Accrediting Commission of Career Schools and Colleges as branch campuses of Platt College in Tulsa, Oklahoma. The Medical Assisting and Surgical Technology programs offered at several campuses are accredited by the Commission on Accreditation of Allied Health Education Programs (www.caahep.org) upon the recommendation of the Medical Assisting Education Review Board (MAERB)

Campus locations
Miller-Motte College operates campuses in eleven cities: Augusta, Georgia; Charleston, South Carolina; Chattanooga, Tennessee; Columbus, Georgia; Macon, Georgia; Conway, South Carolina; Fayetteville, North Carolina; Raleigh, North Carolina; Jacksonville, North Carolina; Wilmington, North Carolina and Tulsa, OK.

Online campus
In August 2009, Miller-Motte College launched a Bachelor of Science degree completion program, Miller-Motte College Online. The site offers numerous degree programs in various fields and expanding rapidly.

References

External links

Colleges accredited by the Accrediting Council for Independent Colleges and Schools
Educational institutions established in 1916
For-profit universities and colleges in the United States
1916 establishments in North Carolina